Mark Zak (born 1959 in Lviv) is a German actor, author and playwright. Since 1990 he has appeared in over a hundred German and international films, including The Tourist and Bridge of Spies.

Biography 

Zak grew up in Odessa and emigrated to West Germany in 1974. He attended the Der Keller acting school in Cologne.

His first novel Glaube, Liebe, Mafia: Ein Fall für Josif Bondar was published in 2013, followed by his play Begleitagentin in 2015. His book about ukrainian anarchist Nestor Makhno "Erinnert euch an mich – über Nestor Machno" was published in 2018.

Partial filmography

1989: Follow Me – Soldat
1990: The Man Inside – Aide To Borges
1995: Bohai Bohau (TV Movie)
1996: Kriegsbilder
1999: Pola X – Romanian friend
1999: Bang Boom Bang – Rumäne 1
2000: Mister Boogie
2000–2004: Tatort (TV Series) – Dr. Oleg Buykov / Boris / Jens Falter
2001: Enemy at the Gates – Russian Captain at Headquarters
2002: A Map of the Heart – Schweigsamer Legionär
2002:  (TV Movie) – Gregor
2003: Der Puppengräber – Junger Russe
2004:  – Monteur Jerzy
2004: Such mich nicht – Georgier – 2. Mordopfer
2004: Agnes and His Brothers – Türsteher
2006: Goldene Zeiten – Alexeji
2006: Klimt – Hevesi
2006: Fay Grim – Saudi Spy
2006: When Darkness Falls – Tyske kriminalaren
2007: Beautiful Bitch – Vasile
2008: Speed Racer – Blackjack Benelli
2008: Balkan Traffic – Übermorgen nirgendwo – Damir
2009:  – Oleg
2009: Der gelbe Satin – Bilal Sahin
2010: Sasha – Mithäftling
2010: The Tourist – Shigalyov
2011: Der Himmel hat vier Ecken – Boris
2011:  – Samuel Kaplan (German exclusive)
2011: Tauwetter – Hoffmann (voice)
2011:  (TV Movie) – Kropotkin (German exclusive)
2011: Hotel Lux – NKWD-Mann 2
2012: The Fourth State – Russian President
2012: Slave – Big Bald Guy
2014: Stereo – Gaspar
2014: Bridge of Spies – Soviet Judge – Powers' Trial
2018: Never Look Away – Dolmetscher Murawjow 
2020: Spy City – Kovrin

External links

References 

Living people
1959 births
German male film actors
German male television actors